Fountainhead, is a motor yacht built in 2011 by Feadship for American billionaire Eddie Lampert.

Design
Fountainhead's exterior was designed by De Voogt Naval Architects and her interior by Sinot Exclusive Yacht Design. The hull is built of steel and the superstructure is made of aluminium, with teak laid decks. The yacht is classed by Lloyd's Register and flagged in the Cayman Islands.

Performance
Propulsion power is delivered by two 4300kW MTU 20V4000 M93L diesel engines.

See also
 Luxury yacht
 List of motor yachts by length
 List of yachts built by Feadship

References 

2011 ships
Motor yachts